Faith Marie Domergue (June 16, 1924, or 1925 – April 4, 1999) was an American film and television actress. Discovered at age sixteen by media and aircraft mogul Howard Hughes, she was signed to a contract with Hughes's RKO Radio Pictures and cast as the lead in the studio's thriller Vendetta, which had a troubled four-year production before finally being released in 1950.

Domergue appeared in science fiction and horror pictures, such as Cult of the Cobra, This Island Earth, It Came from Beneath the Sea, and The Atomic Man, all released in 1955, earning her a reputation as an early "scream queen". Domergue's later career consisted of B movies, television guest roles, and European productions.

Early life
Domergue was born in New Orleans, Louisiana, on June 16, 1924 or 1925 (sources differ), of part-Creole descent. She was adopted by Adabelle Wemet when six weeks old. When Faith was 18 months old, Adabelle married Leo Domergue.

The family moved to California in 1928 where Domergue attended Beverly Hills Catholic School and St. Monica's Convent School. While a sophomore at University High School, she signed a contract with Warner Bros., and made her first on-screen appearance with an uncredited walk-on role in Blues in the Night (1941). The same year, she appeared on the cover of Photoplay as Faith Dorn; the name change, she later claimed, was "because Jack Warner was too stupid to pronounce Domergue".

Career

1943–1950: Early work; Howard Hughes

After graduating in 1942, Domergue continued to pursue a career in acting, but after sustaining injuries in a near-fatal car accident, her plans were put on hold. While recuperating from the accident, she attended a party aboard Howard Hughes' yacht. Enamored with her, Hughes bought out her contract with Warner Brothers,  signed her to a three-picture deal with RKO, and cast her in the thriller Vendetta (1950). The film had a long and troubled production history, with reshoots and several changes of director, further exacerbated by Hughes's health problems following a near-fatal plane crash he endured in July 1946. The production extended over four years and cost $3.5 million.

By the time of Vendettas premiere in 1950, Domergue had left Los Angeles for Palm Springs, and was pregnant with her second child. After the film's release, Domergue separated from Hughes, disappointed with the way the film and her career had been handled: "I was told he spent five million dollars publicizing me", she said, "but [the] film was[n’t properly] released. It was all wasted". The critical reception was also dismissive. The New York Times panned the film as "a garrulous, slow and obvious period piece, weighed down by a profusion of exotic accents, undistinguished dialogue, and unconvincing play acting... set against a background of the wild, Corsican countryside, which does give the picture an atmosphere of suspenseful authenticity". The review damned Domergue's performance with faint praise: "Faith Domergue, the heralded newcomer, is less than a fiery heroine. But despite the flamboyant lines that are her lot, the attractive Miss Domergue does occasionally contribute genuine emotional acting to the proceedings".

Following Vendetta, Domergue freelanced in the film noir Where Danger Lives (1950), playing a femme fatale opposite Robert Mitchum and Claude Rains. Bosley Crowther, in The New York Times, criticized Domergue's performance for "manifest[ing] nothing more than a comparatively sultry appearance and an ability to recite simple lines".

1951–1959: Universal and science fiction films
After having lived briefly in England with her husband, Domergue returned to the United States in 1953, when she signed a contract with Universal Pictures. Her final credit for RKO was the drama This Is My Love (1954), which was shot after the release of her first film with Universal, The Duel at Silver Creek (1952), in which she appeared opposite Audie Murphy.

In 1955, Domergue appeared in another Western, Santa Fe Passage, playing an ammunition retailer opposite John Payne and George Keymas. Domergue then appeared in a series of science fiction, monster, and horror films. The first of these was Cult of the Cobra (Universal Pictures 1955), in which six American Air Force officers discover a Lamian cult of snake worshippers. This was followed with a role in Columbia Pictures's It Came from Beneath the Sea (1955), a science fiction-monster film which was a major commercial success, grossing $1.7 million at the box office. The following year, Domergue starred in This Island Earth (also 1955), Universal's first color science fiction film. The film received moderate critical praise for its performances and writing, as well as its inventive special effects. Domergue's tenure in these pictures earned her a reputation as an early scream queen.

Domergue appeared in a string of European productions: the British science fiction film The Atomic Man (1955), directed by Ken Hughes; British noir films Soho Incident (1956) and Man in the Shadow (1957), released in the United States as Violent Stranger ; and the Italian production, The Sky Burns (1958).

1960–1974: Late career and retirement
In the late 1950s and 1960s, she made many appearances on television series, including Sugarfoot, two episodes of Hawaiian Eye, two episodes of Have Gun – Will Travel, two episodes of Bonanza, The Rifleman, and two episodes of Perry Mason. In her first Perry Mason episode, "The Case of the Guilty Clients" (1961), she played murderer Conception O'Higgins, and in "The Case of the Greek Goddess" (1963) she played murder victim Cleo Grammas.

By the late 1960s, Domergue was appearing mainly in low-budget "B" horror movies and European productions. Domergue's last foray in science fiction was Voyage to the Prehistoric Planet (1965), an American version of a Russian film, mainly backed by Russian producers and populated with Russian actors. She began traveling to Italy in 1952, living in Rome for extended periods. She relocated to Europe permanently in 1968, moving from Rome to Geneva, Switzerland, and Marbella, Spain, until the death of her Italian husband, Paolo, in 1991. In the late 1960s, she appeared in several Italian giallo films, including Lucio Fulci's One on Top of the Other (1969), and Alberto De Martino's The Man with Icy Eyes (1971). Her final film credit was for The House of Seven Corpses (1974), an independent horror film shot in Salt Lake City.

Personal life
In 1942, Domergue began an intermittent relationship with Howard Hughes. After she discovered that Hughes was also seeing Ava Gardner, Rita Hayworth, and Lana Turner, the couple broke up in 1943. She later described those experiences in her 1972 book My Life with Howard Hughes.

On January 28, 1946, Domergue married bandleader Teddy Stauffer at the San Diego Superior Courthouse. On October 8, 1947, hours after divorcing Stauffer in Ciudad Juárez, she married director Hugo Fregonese there. Their first child, Diana Maria, was born on January 1, 1949, in Buenos Aires. Their second child, John Anthony, was born on August 22, 1951, in Los Angeles. John, who became an urban planner, died on what would have been his mother's 94th birthday. The couple separated twice before Domergue was granted an uncontested divorce on June 24, 1958.
 
In 1966, she married director Paolo Cossa, with whom she remained until his death in 1992. Despite the divorces, Domergue remained a practicing Roman Catholic.

Death
Domergue spent her later years in retirement in Palo Alto, California. She died on  April 4, 1999, in Santa Barbara of cancer.

In popular culture
In the 2004 Howard Hughes biopic film The Aviator, Domergue was played by Kelli Garner.

Filmography

Film

Television

Notes

References

Sources

External links

 
 

1920s births
1999 deaths
20th-century American actresses
Actresses from New Orleans
Age controversies
American adoptees
American film actresses
American people of Creole descent
American television actresses
Deaths from cancer in California
People from Greater Los Angeles
RKO Pictures contract players
Catholics from Louisiana